Pedro Bial (born March 29, 1958) is a Brazilian producer, director, writer, journalist and a TV presenter. He is best known for hosting the variety show Fantástico, and the reality show Big Brother Brasil (the Brazilian version of Big Brother).

Career 
Bial graduated in journalism from PUC-RJ. His career, as a reporter, began at Rede Globo in 1981. In 1988, he started to work for Jornal Hoje and Globo Repórter. He also hosted Rede Globo's live broadcast of Rock in Rio II. Bial was international correspondent for Globo network from 1988 to 1996. He replaced Renato Machado on August 13, 1988.

In 1996, he started to host Fantástico. As of 2014, he's been hosting the Big Brother Brasil for 14 seasons.

In 2003 he translated and interpreted "Wear Sunscreen" by Mary Schmich, which was a great success.

On July 5, 2012, he started to present a brand new show called Na Moral.

In 2017, leaves the command of Big Brother Brazil, after 17 editions. In the same year, he takes charge of a talk show called 'Conversa com Bial'.

He is currently a Trustee and columnist of the Instituto Millenium.

Personal life 
He was married to actress Giulia Gam for 2 years. His first  marriage was to actress Fernanda Torres. Bial plays basketball and his brother Alberto Bial is a basketball coach. His sister Irene Bial is a psychotherapist.

Books 
 On 2004, he published the book Roberto Marinho, the authorized biography of Roberto Marinho, founder of Rede Globo.

References 

1958 births
Living people
People from Rio de Janeiro (city)
Brazilian people of Lithuanian descent
Brazilian journalists
Male journalists
Brazilian television presenters
Pontifical Catholic University of Rio de Janeiro alumni